Seth C. Bradford (1801-1878) was an American architect from Newport, Rhode Island.

During his career, Bradford was known as a designer and builder of Italianate-style residences for Newport summer residents.  At least three of his designs utilized a Gothic Revival vocabulary, most blatantly Rockry Hall (1847–48), modeled on Design III from Andrew Jackson Downing's pattern book Cottage Residences (1842).

Today, he is most remembered for his design of Chateau-sur-Mer, the Wetmore family residence on Bellevue Avenue.  In addition to being Bellevue Avenue's first great mansion, it is also credited with introducing the Second Empire style to Newport (although the original mansard has since been replaced).

His popularity in Newport waned in the late 1850s, as other architects like Thomas A. Tefft, Richard Morris Hunt, and George C. Mason began to exert their influence.

Architectural Works
 1847 - Charles Lyman Cottage, 66 Webster St, Newport, Rhode Island
 1847 - Rockry Hall (Albert Sumner Cottage), 425 Bellevue Ave, Newport, Rhode Island
 1849 - James H. Van Alen Cottage, 424 Bellevue Ave, Newport, Rhode Island
 Burned in 1851
 1850 - Belair (H. Allan Wright Cottage), 50 Old Beach Rd, Newport, Rhode Island
 Remodeled by Dudley Newton in 1870
 1850 - Ralph S. Izard Cottage, 10 Pell St, Newport, Rhode Island
 1851 - Mary A. D. Bruen Cottage, 6 Howe Ave, Newport, Rhode Island
 Remodeled by R. M. Hunt in 1870-72
 1851 - Chateau-sur-Mer (William S. Wetmore House), 424 Bellevue Ave, Newport, Rhode Island
 1852 - Fairlawn (Andrew Ritchie Cottage), Bellevue & Ruggles Aves, Newport, Rhode Island
 1852 - Robert M. Mason Cottage, 180 Rhode Island Ave, Newport, Rhode Island
 Remodeled by H. H. Richardson in 1883. Burned 1899.
 1855 - Porter Villa (James C. Porter Cottage), 23 Greenough Pl, Newport, Rhode Island 
 1859 - Gatehouse, Beach Cliffe (Oliver DeLancey Kane Estate), 77 Memorial Blvd, Newport, Rhode Island

References

1801 births
1878 deaths
Architects from Newport, Rhode Island
19th-century American architects